The 2001 Virginia Cavaliers football team representative the University of Virginia in the 2001 NCAA Division I-A football season. The team's head coach was Al Groh. They played their home games at Scott Stadium in Charlottesville, Virginia.

Schedule

Roster

References

Virginia
Virginia Cavaliers football seasons
Virginia Cavaliers football